Lehali (previously known as Teqel) is an Oceanic language spoken by about 200 people, on the west coast of Ureparapara Island in Vanuatu.  It is distinct from Löyöp, the language spoken on the east coast of the same island.

Name
The language is named after the village where it is spoken, natively referred to as Loli . The name Lehali does not have any etymological value, other than being a corruption of the native name.

Phonology
Lehali phonemically contrasts 16 consonants and 10 vowels.

Consonants
{| class="wikitable" style="text-align:center"
|+ Lehali consonants
!colspan="2"|
! Bilabial
! Alveolar
! Dorsal
! Labializedvelar
! Glottal
|-
!colspan="2"| Nasal
|  
|  
|  
|  
|
|-
!rowspan="2"| Stop
! voiceless
|  
|  
|  
|  
|
|-
! prenasalized
|
|  
|
|
|
|-
!colspan="2"| Fricative
|  
|  
|  
|
|  
|-
!colspan="2"| Approximant
|
|  
|  
|  
|
|}

Vowels
The 10 vowel phonemes are all short monophthongs :

{| class="wikitable" style="text-align:center"
|+ Lehali vowels
! |
! |Front
! |Central
! |Back
|-
! Close
|  
|
|  
|-
! Near-close
|  
| rowspan="2" |  
|  
|-
! Open-mid
|  
|  
|-
! Near-open
|  
|
|  
|-
! Open
| colspan="3" |  
|}

Grammar
The system of personal pronouns in Lehali contrasts clusivity, and distinguishes four numbers (singular, dual, trial, plural).

Spatial reference in Lehali is based on a system of geocentric (absolute) directionals, which is in part typical of Oceanic languages, and yet innovative.

References

Bibliography
 .

External links
 Audio recordings in the Lehali language, in open access, by A. François (Pangloss Collection).

Banks–Torres languages
Languages of Vanuatu
Vulnerable languages